Prabhachiwadi is a village in India, situated in the Mawal taluka of Pune district in the state of Maharashtra.

Administration
The village is administrated by a sarpanch, an elected representative who leads a gram panchayat. At the time of the 2011 Census of India, the gram panchayat governed five villages and was based at Mahagaon.

Demography 
According to the 2011 census, the population was 447, split between 238 males and 209 females. There were 59 children with an age group from 0-6, which made up 13.20% of the total population. The Average Sex Ratio was 878 per 1000 males and the Child Sex Ratio was 735. The literacy rate was 70.10%, with the male rate being 81.37% and the female standing at 57.61%. This village had 79 households.

See also
List of villages in Mawal taluka

References

 

Villages in Mawal taluka